Reg Reagan is a fictional character created by Australian rugby league player, Matthew Johns. His signature outfit is a false Horseshoe Moustache, A pillow stuffed in his singlet to resemble a beer gut and a shirt displaying his catchphrase "Bring back the biff" Referring to a semi satirical desire for fights in the sport. 

In 2004, Reagan, released "Am I Ever Gonna See the Biff Again?" a song to the tune of the Angels' 1977 hit "Am I Ever Gonna See Your Face Again?".

Discography

Singles

Awards and nominations

ARIA Music Awards
The ARIA Music Awards are a set of annual ceremonies presented by Australian Recording Industry Association (ARIA), which recognise excellence, innovation, and achievement across all genres of the music of Australia. They commenced in 1987. 

! 
|-
| 2004 || "Am I Ever Gonna See the Biff Again?" || ARIA Award for Best Comedy Release ||  || 
|-

Local Shenanigans 
The Cessnock Wikipedia article was subject to vandalism listing "the illusive Reg Reagan" as a Notable Local.

References

Australian comedy
Comedy television characters
Fictional people from New South Wales